Earl Randolph Ashby Powbett (born May 16, 1921) is a Cuban former baseball catcher in the Negro leagues. He played professionally from 1945 to 1950. Ashby played in the Provincial League in 1950 with the Drummondville Cubs and the St. Jean Braves. Ashby also played with the Cleveland Buckeyes, Birmingham Black Barons, Homestead Grays, and the Newark Eagles.

In June 1955, Ashby Powbett was released from his contract due to "disciplinary reasons". In July, he was a material witness to a manslaughter case in Rochester, New York.

References

External links
 and Seamheads 

1921 births
Possibly living people
Homestead Grays players
Cleveland Buckeyes players
Newark Eagles players
Drummondville Cubs players
St. Jean Braves players
Cuban expatriate baseball players in the United States
Baseball players from Havana
Cuban expatriate baseball players in Canada
Baseball catchers